Bahrain Islamic Bank is a commercial bank based in Manama, Bahrain, founded on 7 March 1979, and started operating from the beginning of the Hijri Year 1400 (2nd of Muharram) which was the 22 November 1979.

It is the first islamic bank in the Kingdom of Bahrain, works under supervision of the Central Bank of Bahrain and is listed on the Bahrain Stock Exchange.

In January 2016, the Moody's Investors Service confirmed its ratings and upgraded the standalone baseline credit assessment (BCA) to b3 from caa1.

See also 

List of banks in Asia

References

External links 
Homepage

Banks of Bahrain
Banks established in 1979
1979 establishments in Bahrain
Companies based in Manama